Jan Amandus Van Droogenbroeck (Sint-Amands, 17 January 1835 - Schaerbeek, 27 May 1902), pseudonym Jan Ferguut, was a Flemish poet and writer. He was a teacher and a civil servant.

He was a pupil of Jan Van Beers at the Normaalschool in Lier, and a follower of Johan Michiel Dautzenberg. Jan Van Droogenbroeck contributed to the magazines De Toekomst, Noord en Zuid, and Het Nederlandsch Tijdschrift.

Streets were named after him in Schaerbeek and Sint-Amands.

Bibliography
 Makamen en ghazelen (1866)
 Ondine (1867
 Dit zijn zonnestralen (1873)
 Torquato Tasso's dood (1873) – Torquato Tasso
 Camoens (1879) – Camoens
 De morgen (1887)
 Spreuken en sproken (1891)
 Gedichten (1894)

See also
 Flemish literature

Sources
 Joannes Amandus van Droogenbroeck  (Dutch)
 Jan Van Droogenbroeck (Dutch)
 Daems, S., 'J.A. van Droogenbroeck (Jan Ferguut)', Winkler-Prinzlexicon (1887). 
 Muyldermans, J., 'Levensschets van Jan van Droogenbroeck', Jaarboek der Koninklijke Vlaamse Academie 22 (1908). 
 van den Bossche, M., 'Bibliografie van en over J.A. van Droogenbroeck, alias Jan Ferguut', Heemkundig Jaarboek Klein-Brabant (1971) 43-64. 
 Wittebols, J., 'Over dichter Jan van Droogenbroeck en mijn oude bloemlezingen', Tijdingen Beatrijsgezelschap 14 (1978-1979) nr. 4, p. 20-29.

1835 births
1902 deaths
Flemish writers
People from Puurs-Sint-Amands